Sir John Lang "Jock" Taylor  (3 August 1924 – 30 September 2002) was a British diplomat.  He was British ambassador to Venezuela (1975–79), the Netherlands, (1979–81) and West Germany (1981–84).

He was the son of Sir John William Taylor KBE CMG.  His own son is the diplomat Duncan Taylor.

References 

1924 births
2002 deaths
Ambassadors of the United Kingdom to the Netherlands
Ambassadors of the United Kingdom to Venezuela
Ambassadors of the United Kingdom to West Germany
Knights Commander of the Order of St Michael and St George